Yamilé Córdova (born 7 September 1972) is a Cuban former professional tennis player.

Active in the 1990s, Cordova competed in ITF events and was a regular fixture in the Cuba Fed Cup team, appearing in a total of 25 ties. She has the distinction of having won all 14 of her Fed Cup singles rubbers. In doubles she won a further 15 rubbers, of which 12 came in partnership with Yoannis Montesino, setting a team record.

ITF finals

Doubles: 1 (1–0)

References

External links
 
 
 

1972 births
Living people
Cuban female tennis players
Central American and Caribbean Games medalists in tennis
Central American and Caribbean Games bronze medalists for Cuba
Competitors at the 1993 Central American and Caribbean Games
Competitors at the 1998 Central American and Caribbean Games